Johnny Parker may refer to:

Johnny Parker (jazz pianist) (1929–2010), British jazz pianist
Johnny Parker (rugby league), Australian rugby player
Johnny Parker (born Jonathan Parker in 1922), composer, instrumentalist, singer and songwriter, bandmate of Hugo Winterhalter and His Orchestra

See also
John Parker (disambiguation)